is a Japanese pharmaceutical company. Sato Pharmaceutical's main focus is on over-the-counter medicines. The company's products are sold in 14 countries around the world. The company's customer bases are located in Asia, North America and Europe, Taiwan, Hong Kong, Singapore, the US, Canada and Germany.

The company is known for its marketing mascots, Sato-chan and Satoko-chan, a pair of Indian elephant siblings, first introduced in 1959.

Sato Pharmaceutical Canada
Sato Pharmaceutical Canada Inc is the Canadian subsidiary of the company, headquartered in Vancouver, British Columbia. Sato Pharmaceutical Canada opened its Vancouver office in autumn of 2006. The Canadian operation primarily focuses on selling the Kenzen products, such as medicated pads, gel, and spray, and the Yunker Kotei Natural Energy Drinks.

References

 Kenzen Pads - London Drugs
 Kenzen Pad Presentation
 Japanese herbal supplement to go on sale in Canada

External links

 Sato Pharmaceutical Corporation - Japanese website 
 Sato Pharmaceutical Canada Inc - Canadian website 
 Sato Pharmaceutical Inc. - Official US website 

Pharmaceutical companies of Japan
Health care companies of Japan
Companies based in Tokyo
Pharmaceutical companies established in 1939
Japanese companies established in 1939
Japanese brands